Prabodh Chandra was a freedom fighter and an Indian politician.

Early life
Born at Rawalpindi (now in Pakistan) on 24 October 1911, to Satya Dev, Headmaster of a Government High School and Durga Devi, he did his matriculation from the Government High School, Gujrat, Pakistan in 1927 and his Intermediate as a private candidate in 1930 before completing his graduation and Post Graduation from the F.C. College, Lahore (now in Pakistan). An admirer of Swami Dayanand Saraswati,Subhash Chandra Bose and Maulana Abdul Kalam Azad, he was also influenced by the lives of Shivaji and Garibaldi.

Political career
Chandra started his political career at the age of 16 and formed the Multan Student Union in 1927. He was closely associated with the Lahore Revolutionary Party and was arrested in connection with the Multan Bomb case in 1929. He was first jailed in 1930 and 1936, and again from 1942 to 1945. He laid the foundations of the students' movement in Punjab, and was Chairman of the All India Students' Conference in 1936. He was also selected as the sole representative of the Indian students to the World Youth Congress in Budapest in 1938 which he could not attend.

Later on he joined the Indian National Congress and was a member of the Punjab Pradesh Congress Committee. He was elected a Member of the Punjab Legislative Assembly in 1946. After independence, he remained Member of the Punjab Legislative Assembly in 1952, 1960 and 1962.

He held the august office of the Speaker of Punjab assembly March 1962 to March 1964. He served as a Minister of Education, Health and local Self Government in the Council of Ministers of Punjab. He was also a Member of Parliament from 1971 to 1977. He was associated with numerous public and Government bodies in his lifetime.

He died on 8 February 1986.

References

1911 births
1986 deaths
People from Rawalpindi
Speakers of the Punjab Legislative Assembly